The third season of the police procedural drama NCIS was originally broadcast between September 20, 2005, and May 16, 2006, on CBS. The third season opens in the aftermath of "Twilight", with the entire team in shock and Gibbs on a vendetta to seek revenge for Kate's murder. Matters are complicated by the intervention of Gibbs' former lover and new NCIS director Jenny Shepard, and Mossad officer Ziva David.

This season begins to drop little hints about Gibbs' past, and is the first to reference his first wife, Shannon, and his daughter, Kelly. The season finale introduces his former boss, Mike Franks (Muse Watson), who assists Gibbs in recovering from a near-fatal bomb blast. The season ends with Gibbs retiring, leaving DiNozzo in charge of the Major Case Response Team.

Cast

Main 
 Mark Harmon as Leroy Jethro Gibbs, NCIS Supervisory Special Agent (SSA) of the Major Case Response Team (MCRT) assigned to Washington's Navy Yard
 Michael Weatherly as Anthony DiNozzo, NCIS Senior Special Agent, second in command of MCRT
 Cote de Pablo as Ziva David, Mossad Liaison Officer to NCIS (episodes 4–24)
 Pauley Perrette as Abby Sciuto, Forensic Specialist for NCIS
 Sean Murray as Timothy McGee, NCIS Probationary Special Agent
 Lauren Holly as Jenny Shepard, new NCIS Director (episodes 9–24)
 David McCallum as Dr. Donald "Ducky" Mallard, Chief Medical Examiner for NCIS

Recurring 
 Cote de Pablo as Ziva David, Mossad Liaison Officer to NCIS (episodes 1–2)
 Lauren Holly as Jenny Shephard, new NCIS Director (episodes 1–2, 4, 6–8)
 Alan Dale as Thomas Morrow, departing NCIS Director
 Joe Spano as Tobias Fornell, FBI Senior Special Agent
 Pancho Demmings as Gerald Jackson, departing Assistant Medical Examiner for NCIS and Ducky's first assistant
 Jessica Steen as Paula Cassidy, NCIS Senior Special Agent
 Rudolf Martin as Ari Haswari, rogue Mossad Agent who killed Caitlin Todd
 Brian Dietzen as Jimmy Palmer, Assistant Medical Examiner for NCIS
 Nina Foch as Victoria Mallard, Ducky's mother
 Tamara Taylor as Cassie Yates, NCIS Special Agent
 Kent Shocknek as Guy Ross, ZNN news anchor
 Mary Mouser as Kelly Gibbs, Gibbs' deceased daughter
 Darby Stanchfield as Shannon Gibbs, Gibbs' deceased wife
 Michael Bellisario as Charles Sterling, Abby's lab assistant
 Stephanie Mello as Cynthia Summer, NCIS Secretary to Director Shepard
 Muse Watson as Mike Franks, retired Senior Special Agent for NCIS and Gibbs' former boss
 Don Franklin as Ron Sacks, FBI Special Agent

Guest appearances 
 Sasha Alexander as Caitlin Todd, deceased NCIS Special Agent who was killed by Ari Haswari

Episodes

DVD special features

References

General references 
 
 
 

2005 American television seasons
2006 American television seasons
NCIS 03